Fern James Headley (March 2, 1900 — September 28, 1956) was an American-born Canadian professional ice hockey defenseman who played 30 games in the National Hockey League for the Montreal Canadiens and Boston Bruins during the 1924–25 season. The rest of his career, which lasted from 1922 to 1939, was primarily spent in the American Hockey Association. He was born in Crystal, North Dakota, but grew up in Saskatoon, Saskatchewan.
He scored one NHL goal.  It occurred as a member of the Boston Bruins on December 17, 1924 in his team's 6-2 loss to the Montreal Maroons.

Career statistics

Regular season and playoffs

References

External links

1900 births
1956 deaths
American men's ice hockey defensemen
Boston Bruins players
Calgary Tigers players
Canadian ice hockey defencemen
Chicago Shamrocks players
Duluth Hornets players
Ice hockey people from North Dakota
Ice hockey people from Saskatchewan
Kansas City Greyhounds players
Minneapolis Millers (AHA) players
Montreal Canadiens players
People from Pembina County, North Dakota
St. Louis Flyers (AHA) players
Saskatoon Sheiks players
Sportspeople from Saskatoon
Tulsa Oilers (AHA) players
Wichita Skyhawks players